Johann Gottfried Zeller (5 January 1656 - 7 April 1734) was a German physician and medical writer.

Life 
He was born in Lienzingen, a hamlet in Mühlacker in the Duchy of Württemberg. His parents wished for him a career as a religious minister, but he chose to study medicine at the University of Tübingen. He then traveled through France, Holland, and Germany in furtherance of a doctorate. In 1684, he obtained a post with the Count of Oettingen. He returned to mainly teach at Tübingen. He traveled in 1716 to Vienna to attend to the pregnancy of the Austrian empress.

Works 
 De vasorum Lymphaticorum administratione et phaenomenis secundum et praeter naturam
 Quod pulmonis in aqua subsidentia infanticidas non absolvat - describes that the sinking of a lung does not prove a newborn was not alive
 Vita humana ex funiculo pendens (1692)
 Molae viriles mirabiles (1696)
 De Morbis ex structura glandularum praeternaturali natis (1698)
 De gonorrhaea virulenta in utroque sexu (1700)
 Quastio docimastica super causam et noxas vini lithargirio mangonisati, variis experimentis illustrata (1707)
 Dissertatio de mammis et lacte 1727
 Celebrium Wurtenbergiae nostae acidularum Teinacensium examen (1727)
 De ectropio , accedunt in prefatione de cataracta membranacea observationes (1733)

References 

1656 births
1734 deaths
People from Mühlacker
Academic staff of the University of Tübingen
17th-century German physicians
18th-century German physicians
17th-century German writers
17th-century German male writers
18th-century German writers
18th-century German male writers